Robinsons Bank Corporation, also known as RBank, is a commercial bank which provides banking services for retail and business customers in the Philippines.

History
The company was formerly known as Robinsons Savings Bank and changed its name to Robinsons Bank Corporation in May 2011. Robinsons Bank Corporation was founded in 1997 and is based in Quezon City with branches across the Philippines. Robinsons Bank Corporation operates as a subsidiary of JG Summit Holdings, Inc. In 2012, Robinsons Bank acquired majority ownership of the Legazpi Savings Bank based in Legazpi, Albay.

On September 30, 2022, Robinsons Bank together with Bank of the Philippine Islands disclosed their merger expected to complete by 2023, with BPI as the surviving entity.

See also

List of banks in the Philippines
BancNet

References

Banks of the Philippines
Banks established in 1997
Companies based in Quezon City
JG Summit Holdings subsidiaries